The Three Musketeers is a 1969 television film based on the 1844 novel The Three Musketeers (Les Trois Mousquetaires) by Alexandre Dumas. It stars Kenneth Welsh as d'Artagnan. The Three Musketeers, Athos, Porthos and Aramis, are played by Powys Thomas, James Blendick and Colin Fox.  Academy Award-winner actor Christopher Walken makes a very early film appearance as Felton.

Premise 
A young man named d'Artagnan leaves home to travel to Paris, with the intention to join the Musketeers. Although d'Artagnan is not able to join this elite corps immediately, he befriends the three most formidable musketeers of the age — Athos, Porthos and Aramis — and gets involved in affairs of the state and court.

Cast 
Colin Fox as Aramis
Powys Thomas as Athos
Kenneth Welsh as d'Artagnan
James Blendick as Porthos
Leo Ciceri as Cardinal Richelieu
Martha Henry as Lady Sabine DeWinter
Christopher Walken as John Felton
Eric Donkin as (King) Louis XIV

See also
 List of American films of 1969

External links

1969 films
American swashbuckler films
Films based on The Three Musketeers
1969 adventure films
Films set in the 1620s
Films set in France
Films set in Paris
Cultural depictions of Cardinal Richelieu
Cultural depictions of Louis XIV
Television shows based on The Three Musketeers
1960s English-language films
1960s American films